The House of Della Rovere (literally "of the oak tree") was a noble family of Italy. It had humble origins in Savona, in Liguria, and acquired power and influence through nepotism and ambitious marriages arranged by two Della Rovere popes: Francesco Della Rovere, who ruled as Sixtus IV from 1471 to 1484) and his nephew Giuliano, who became Julius II in 1503. Sixtus IV built the Sistine Chapel, which is named for him. The Basilica of San Pietro in Vincoli in Rome is the family church of the Della Rovere. Members of the family were influential in the Church of Rome, and as dukes of Urbino; that title was extinguished with the death of Francesco Maria II in 1631, and the family died out with the death of his granddaughter Vittoria, Grand Duchess of Tuscany.

History 

Francesco Della Rovere was born into a poor family in Liguria in north-west Italy in 1414, the son of Leonardo della Rovere of Savona. He was elected pope in 1471. As Sixtus IV he was both wealthy and powerful, and at once set about giving power and wealth to his nephews of the Della Rovere and Riario families. Within months of his election, he had made Giuliano della Rovere (the future pope Julius II) and Pietro Riario both cardinals and bishops; four other nephews were also made cardinals. He made Giovanni Della Rovere, who was not a priest, prefect of Rome, and arranged for him to marry into the da Montefeltro family, dukes of Urbino. Sixtus claimed descent from a noble Della Rovere family, the counts of Vinovo in Piemonte, and adopted their coat-of-arms.

Guidobaldo da Montefeltro adopted Francesco Maria I della Rovere, his sister's child and nephew of Pope Julius II. Guidobaldo I, who was heirless, called Francesco Maria at his court, and named him as heir of the Duchy of Urbino in 1504, this through the intercession of Julius II. In 1508, Francesco Maria inherited the duchy thereby starting the line of Rovere Dukes of Urbino. That dynasty ended in 1626 when Pope Urban VIII incorporated Urbino into the papal dominions. As compensation to the last sovereign duke, the title only could be continued by Francesco Maria II, and after his death by his heir, Federico Ubaldo.

Vittoria, last descendant of the della Rovere family (she was the only child of Federico Ubaldo), married Ferdinando II de' Medici, Grand Duke of Tuscany. They had two children: Cosimo III, Tuscany's longest reigning monarch, and Francesco Maria de' Medici, a prince of the Church.

Rovere Dukes of Urbino (1508)
Francesco Maria I della Rovere (1490–1538)
Guidobaldo II della Rovere (1514–1574)
Francesco Maria II della Rovere (1549–1631) - duchy abolished, title continued
Federico Ubaldo della Rovere (1605–1623) - title became extinct with his death.

Other people with the same surname 

Among the many people who did not belong to this family, but bore the same name, are:
 the Della Rovere family, counts of Vinovo, among them:
 Domenico della Rovere of Vinovo, cardinal, who built the  there
 his brother Cristoforo della Rovere of Vinovo
and various artists, including:
 the brothers Giovan Battista Della Rovere and Giovan Mauro Della Rovere, both known as "il Fiamminghino"
 an unrelated Lombard family of painters and illuminators active in the seventeenth century.

Gallery

References

Further reading
 Ian Verstegen (2007). Patronage and Dynasty: the Rise of the Della Rovere in Renaissance Italy. Kirksville, Missouri: Truman State University Press.

Italian noble families
 
Papal families
Roman Catholic families